Metzneria sanguinea is a moth of the family Gelechiidae. It was described by Edward Meyrick in 1934. It is found in Rwanda.

References

Moths described in 1934
Metzneria